Les Cartwright  (born March 4, 1952) was a Welsh international footballer. He was part of the Wales national football team between 1974 and 1978, playing 7 matches. He played his first match on 11 May 1974 against England and his last match on 25 October 1978 against Malta.

See also
 List of Wales international footballers (alphabetical)

References

1952 births
Welsh footballers
Wales international footballers
Place of birth missing
Date of death missing
Coventry City F.C. players
Wrexham A.F.C. players
Cambridge United F.C. players
Southend United F.C. players
Nuneaton Borough F.C. players
Association football midfielders